Hana Bank (KEB Hana Bank outside South Korea) is a commercial bank headquartered in Seoul, South Korea. Since its establishment as Korea Exchange Bank in 1967, it provides the largest range of foreign exchange products in South Korea.

History

Korea Exchange Bank (1967–2015)

Establishment and privatization
Korea Exchange Bank was established in 1967 as a government-owned bank specializing in foreign exchange. It was privatized in 1989 and was one of Korea's first commercial banks. During the 2002 FIFA World Cup in Korea and Japan, KEB was the first Korean bank to export Korean won to another nation, by exporting bundles of 10000 won notes to Japan.
Jan 1975: Started securities business
Apr 1978: Launched Korea's first credit card service
Mar 1983: Issued travelers cheques
Feb 1985: Official sponsor bank for 1986 Asian Games & 1988 Summer Olympics
Apr 1994: Listed on Korean Stock Exchange
Dec 1995: Opened foreign exchange research center
Nov 1999: Opened a foreign exchange website offering exchange rate conversions and foreign exchange services
Apr 2001: Opened the foreign exchange website FXKEB.COM
Jun 2002: Introduced ATM services in foreign currency - a first for Korea

Acquisition by Lone Star Funds
Korea Exchange Bank was acquired in 2003 by Lone Star Funds, a private U.S. equity fund, as part of the general reorganization of the South Korean financial sector following the Asian financial crisis.
In 2006, Lone Star tried to sell the company to the highest bidder, Kookmin Bank, but the plan was scrapped when it faced investigations by South Korean prosecutors and regulators.
In September 2007, HSBC agreed to purchase a controlling stake for $6 billion, but the sale was not approved by the South Korean government.
In September 2008, Kookmin Bank and Hana Bank were considered for a takeover of KEB after HSBC failed to acquire the bank in 2007.
Oct 2003: Acquired by Lone Star Funds
Feb 2004: Merged Korea Exchange Bank Credit Service Co.
Aug 2014: Korea Exchange Bank Credit Group Separated from Korea Exchange Bank

Acquisition by Hana Financial Group
In February 2012, Hana Financial Group Inc. completed its  purchase of Korea Exchange Bank from Lone Star Funds and Export Import Bank of Korea.
Jan 2015: Launched 1QBank and the 1Q INSTA Card in Canada, becoming the first bank in Canada to offer a prepaid Interac card not linked to a bank account.

Hana Bank (2015–present)
After years-long efforts, Hana Financial Group merged Hana Bank and Korea Exchange Bank (KEB) and launched KEB Hana Bank in September 2015.
Feb 2019: Name changed from KEB Hana Bank to Hana Bank
Jun 2021: Secured approval from Taiwan's financial authorities to open a branch in Taiwan, making it the first bank from South Korea to set up a foothold in Taiwan.

Controversies regarding the acquisition of Korea Exchange Bank 
There were some issues that happened in the process of the acquisition and sale of Korea Exchange Bank(KEB) by Lone Star Funds, a private U.S. equity fund. The issues caused a lot of conflicts between Lone Star Funds and South Korean regulatory authorities.

According to the Banking Act of South Korea, Article 2 defines, "The term "non-financial business operator" means a person falling under any of the following items:

(a) The same person with respect to which the total amount of gross capital (referring to the gross amount of assets less the gross amount of debts, on the balance sheet; hereinafter the same shall apply) of persons who are non-financial companies (referring to companies that run such non-financial businesses as determined by the Presidential Decree; hereinafter the same shall apply) is not less than 25/100 of the total amount of gross capital of persons who are companies;

(b) The same person with respect to which the total amount of gross capital of persons who are non-financial companies is not less than such an amount as prescribed by the Presidential Decree, which is not less than two trillion won; and

(c) A securities investment company under the Securities Investment Company Act (hereinafter referred to as the "securities investment company") with respect to which a person as referred to in item (a) or (b) holds more than 4/100 of the total number of the issued stocks (referring to the case that the same person owns stocks under his or another person's name or has voting rights to them through a contract, etc.; hereinafter the same shall apply)."

Therefore, Lone Star Funds might have been considered as non-financial business operator.

Issues regarding the acquisition 
In 2003, Lone Star Funds tried to acquire Korea Exchange Bank. It was controversial because, according to the Banking Act, a non-financial business operator is not entitled to acquire a bank unless a bank's BIS ratio is below 8%. Consequently, the president of KEB, Kang-won Lee sent a report that Korea Exchange Bank's BIS ratio was assessed as 6.16% as of July 25, 2003. Based on the report, the Financial Supervisory Service approved the acquisition. Hence, Lone Star Funds was able to acquire the bank at the price of about 1.3 billion dollars as of October 2003.

However, after the acquisition, as the stock price of Korea Exchange Bank rose, Lone Star got about $1 billion of an appraisal profit within 3 months. Therefore, in the National Assembly inspection of 2005, is arisen the suspicion that Korea Exchange Bank was sold at a significantly lower price than its fair market value because BIS ratio was assessed with the pessimistic scenario, given that KEB's BIS ratio had been assessed between 8.24% and 9.14% according to the three reports written between May 17, 2003, and July 16, 2003. Thus, the National Assembly ordered the Board of Audit and Inspection to investigate the suspicion.

In June 2006, the Board concluded that the BIS ratio of 6.16% was assessed as unreasonably low under the unrealistically pessimistic scenario. Following the conclusion of the Board of Audit and Inspection, in November 2006, the prosecution started an investigation on the issue and prosecuted Kang-won Lee, the former president of Korea Exchange Bank, for breach of duty. In November 2008, the trial court ruled for Lee, and the verdict did not change in both appellate court and the Supreme Court.

Issues regarding the sale 
From January 2006, Lone Star Funds pursued the sale of KEB. However, during the period, there were ongoing investigations and trials regarding KEB, and thus South Korea's financial regulators did not approve each attempt. The disapproval was because the potential possibility of Lone Star's invalid ownership depending on the results of the trial. In September 2007, Lone Star Funds and HSBC had a preliminary agreement for the sale of KEB. However, the Financial Services Commission was still holding off the approval. After the 2008 global financial crisis, on September 19, 2008, HSBC gave up the acquisition of KEB. Eventually, on February 9, 2012, Lone Star Funds were forced to sell the KEB to Hana Financial Group due to the guilty verdict from the Korea Exchange Bank Credit Service stock manipulation case.

On November 22, 2012, Lone Star brought arbitration against South Korea before the International Center for Settlement of Investment Disputes (ICSID). Lone Star Funds alleged the Korean regulatory authorities' failures to approve the purchase by third parties of claimant's stake in Korea Exchange Bank, and the unfair imposition of arbitrary capital gains taxes on the sale by Korean tax authorities. Lone Star claimed that the delay of approving Lone Star's sale of KEB shares until the forced sale was illegitimate because it was upon the hostility of public opinion against Lone Star Funds, and the delay caused the financial loss because they had lost other chances to sell at a higher price due to the delay. In addition, Lone Star claimed that South Korea's tax authorities applied inconsistent and arbitrary standards for the transfer income tax regarding the sale of KEB shares for the purpose of extracting the maximum amount of taxes from Lone Star. For the compensation, Lone Star Funds demands about $4.7 billion, and the arbitration is ongoing in 2020.

Foreign exchange 
Hana Bank is the largest and longest-running exchange bank in South Korea, with 40% of South Korea's foreign exchange market. Its exchange services include currency exchange and wire transfers. Hana exchanges the following currencies:

1. Asia

 dollar
 dollar
 dollar
 yen
 baht
 rupee
 ringgit
 new dollar
 dong
 rupiah
 renminbi
 peso

2. North America & South America

 dollar
 dollar
 real
 peso
 peso

3. Oceania

 dollar
 dollar

4. Middle Eastern & Africa

 rand
 pound
 dinar
 riyal
 new sheqel
 dinar
 dinar
 dirham
 riyal
 riyal

5. European

 krone
 pound
 krona
 ruble
 tenge
 forint
 franc
 krone
 euro
 złoty
 koruna
 lira

All Hana Bank branches in South Korea provide foreign exchange services. Some of the more common currencies, such as US Dollar, euro, and Japanese Yen are available at all Hana branches.

Travellers Cheques were first introduced in South Korea by Korea Exchange Bank, through Visa. Today, many Travellers Cheques companies offer travellers cheques through Korea Exchange Bank.

Korea Exchange Bank is one of few specialized banks in South Korea that buys and sells foreign currency coinage.
Foreign currency coinage exchangeable at Hana are:
United States dollar
Euro
Japanese yen
Canadian dollar
British pound
Hong Kong dollar
Swiss franc
Australian dollar

Other commercial banks in South Korea that provide foreign exchange services include Kookmin Bank and Shinhan Bank.

See also

Hana Bank Invitational
LPGA KEB Hana Bank Championship
List of Banks in South Korea
List of South Korean companies
Economy of South Korea
Lone Star Funds

References

External links

Banks of South Korea
Companies based in Seoul
Banks established in 1967
South Korean companies established in 1967
Foreign exchange companies